Abrahdar (also Romanized as Abrehdar; also known as Ābardarreh, Abradar, and Abredar) is a village in Kharrazan Rural District, in the Central District of Tafresh County, Markazi Province, Iran. At the 2006 census, its population was 215, in 101 families.

References 

Populated places in Tafresh County